The Underbank is an area of Stockport, Greater Manchester, containing the streets of Little Underbank and Great Underbank. Originally considered the finest shopping street in Stockport during the 19th century, the street was dubbed as Stockport's answer to Soho following an influx of independent businesses.

The Underbank began to be developed when the increased use of wheeled transport necessitated a practical route from the brow to the nearby Roman road, facilitating traffic to London for over 400 years. The rapid expansion of the town following the Industrial Revolution let to increased development from the late 18th century. By the 19th century, Little Underbank contained a prestigious shopping district, with over 30 shops of various trades such as hosiers, milliners and curriers.

Since 1974, the Underbank has been included in the Market Underbank Conservation Area. Following a £1.8 million grant from the National Lottery Heritage Fund in 2017, Stockport Metropolitan Borough Council launched the 'Rediscovering the Underbanks' project, regenerating the area following neglect in favour of the nearby Merseyway Shopping Centre.

History
The area which would later house the Underbank was formed by the Hempshaw Brook cutting a valley along its southwestern side, eroding the natural red sandstone.

The Great Underbank and Little Underbank roads came about due to the proliferation of wheeled transport necessitating a practical route to the Roman road nearby the market.

The White Lion, then a coaching inn, would acquire its license as early as the 14th century. The inn's proximity to the River Mersey led to the belief that visitors were permitted to fish for Salmon from the beer garden, and to use the inn's pew at the nearby St Mary's Church.

Underbank Hall was built in the late 15th century to serve as a town house for the Arderne family of Bredbury. A similar town house was eventually known as The Three Shires was built in 1580 for the Leghs of Adlington.

The Industrial Revolution led to rapid expansion in the area. Brick buildings began to replace the earlier timber frame in the late 18th century, and by the 19th century Little Underbank would contain a prestigious shopping district. Jeweller Jacob Winter would move his premises to the Underbank from nearby Lower Hillgate. Winter's jewellers would become notable for its clock, and hydraulically operated security features.

The Underbank began to suffer from neglect, with traders complaining that the area was neglected in favour of Merseyway Shopping Centre, which opened in 1965. Other complaints included the lack of street lighting, lack of parking spaces and its untidy state. The area would become part of the newly designated Market Underbank Conservation Area in 1974.

In 2017, a grant of £1.8 million was secured through the National Lottery Heritage Fund, allowing Stockport Metropolitan Borough Council and the Stockport Heritage Trust to pursue the 'Rediscovering the Underbanks' project, aimed at breathing new life im the area. The streets cobbles were repaired, and buildings in the area were restored and refurbished. The area would also see an influx of independent businesses, leading the area to be coined as 'Stockport's Soho'.

Landmarks

The Underbank contains many historic listed buildings, such as the  remnants of the medieval town wall, the Tudor Underbank Hall and the Three Shires Hall, and several Victorian buildings.

Culture
The Underbank was used as a filming location for 2019 BBC sitcom Scarborough, for the Geraldine's of Scarborough hair salon.

2020 Netflix thriller ''The Stranger would additionally feature the Underbank.

References

Tourist attractions in the Metropolitan Borough of Stockport
Roads in England
Roads in Greater Manchester